Samir Ionel Zamfir (born 7 October 1967) is a retired Romanian football midfielder.

References

1967 births
Living people
Romanian footballers
CS Universitatea Craiova players
FC Martigues players
Hapoel Ashkelon F.C. players
Association football midfielders
Liga I players
Ligue 1 players
Romanian expatriate footballers
Expatriate footballers in France
Romanian expatriate sportspeople in France
Expatriate footballers in Israel
Romanian expatriate sportspeople in Israel
Sportspeople from Craiova